ArcTanGent Festival (also known as ATG) is a three-day British rock festival held annually at Fernhill Farm in Somerset, England since 2013. It is the most popular British summer festival for math rock, post rock, progressive metal and experimental music. Previous performers include Explosions in the Sky, Glassjaw, Godspeed You! Black Emperor, Meshuggah, Coheed & Cambria, Shellac, The Dillinger Escape Plan, Converge, Russian Circles, Deafheaven, Cult of Luna, American Football, Battles, Public Service Broadcasting, And So I Watch You from Afar, 65daysofstatic, Fuck Buttons, La Dispute, TesseracT, Daughters and Mono.

The festival features five stages, silent disco after the live performances have finished, a selection of bars and food vendors, and weekend camping and VIP options.

2013 

The 2013 edition of the festival was the first to be held. It has since returned annually, albeit now one week earlier each year.

The Yohkai stage was curated by Damnation Festival on the Friday.

2014 

The PX3 stage was relocated from the campsite to the main arena for the 2014 edition and every year since.

2015 

Where the 2013–14 editions were held on the last weekend in August, the 2015 edition moved a week earlier in August where it has remained since.

The 2015 edition was the first time the PX3 stage hosted performances on all three days of the festival, with the Thursday PX3 program curated by BBC Introducing. This edition of the festival also included a Sargent House takeover, with several of their artists performing including Deafheaven, Emma Ruth Rundle, Marriages, Helms Alee and Mylets.

Cult of Luna were originally scheduled to perform on the Arc stage before Deafheaven, however they instead headlined the Yohkai stage after flight delays.

2016 

The Bixler stage was relocated from the campsite to the main arena for the 2016 edition and every year since. All four stages are now situated in the main arena.

Cleft performed their final ever show at the 2016 edition of the festival. The set was recorded and the movie posthumously screened across seven UK shows in December 2018 as part of One More Tour: In Memory of Dan Wild-Beesley.

2017

2018 

The 2018 event was the first year in which the Arc stage featured bands performing on all three days.

The Thursday Yohkai and PX3 lineups were curated in part by Big Scary Monsters vs Holy Roar respectively.

Gallops were the first band to play a live set as part of the silent disco, performing fully electric on the Thursday night.

Chiyoda Ku replaced Mugstar on the Yohkai stage. Jo Quail joined Takaakira 'Taka' Goto for the Behind The Shadow Drops performance.

The festival marked Giraffes? Giraffes! first ever performance outside of North America since their formation in 2001.

2019 

On 6 September 2018 Meshuggah was announced as the first headliner.

The 2019 event featured an expanded site footprint and an additional campsite, albeit the layout remained largely unchanged. There was also the introduction of the Bar Stage, located in the centre of the site.

Friday night once again featured live sets as part of the silent disco, including The Algorithm and GosT. There were also silent disco sets from John Stanier and Effigy across the weekend.

The main stage was opened by The Beft; a Tribute to Dan Wild-Beesley of Cleft and featured guest musicians including Mike Vennart. Black Peaks set featured Jamie Lenman on vocals due to the absence of the band's singer Will Gardner. And So I Watch You From Afar performed their debut album in full for an unannounced special guest slot on the Arc stage.

2020–21 cancellations due to COVID-19 

On 5 May 2020, ArcTanGent was cancelled due to the COVID-19 pandemic. On 21 May 2021, ArcTanGent was cancelled again due to the COVID-19 pandemic, citing the lack of a government insurance scheme to cover COVID-19-related cancellations of music festivals (especially due to increasing spread of Lineage B.1.617 in the UK amid its lifting of restrictions).

2022 

ArcTanGent 2022 is scheduled for 16–20 August 2022. The line-up is:

Awards 

During 2013–2014, the festival was shortlisted for several awards including, Best New Festival, Best Grassroots Festival and Best Small Festival at the UK Festival Awards as well as Best Independent Music Festival at the AIM Awards.

In 2013, the festival won the award for Best Toilets at the UK Festival Awards. In 2016, the festival was shortlisted for Best Headline Performance of the Year for American Football and Line Up of the Year at the UK Festival Awards. In 2018, the festival won the award for Best Small Festival at the UK Festival Awards.

Annual warm-up 

The festival has hosted an official annual warm-up party each year in Bristol, England in collaboration with promoters Effigy, ForFans ofBands and ArtScare. The event takes place in May each year and has featured mainstays and favourites of the festival including Gallops, The Physics House Band, Cleft, Talons, Toska, Alpha Male Tea Party, Memory of Elephants, Chiyoda Ku, Sœur and Jo Quail

References

External links 
 ArcTanGent official site

Music festivals established in 2013
2013 establishments in England
Rock festivals in England